Andy Ologun  (born June 12, 1983) is a Nigerian professional boxer, mixed martial artist, kickboxer and actor who has fought for K-1 and DREAM. He is the younger brother of television personality and mixed martial artist, Bobby Ologun.

Ologun holds a notable K-1 kickboxing win over Takayuki Kohiruimaki and a win at Dynamite!! 2010 against former pro baseball Yokohama DeNA BayStars player turned mixed martial artist Katsuaki Furuki. Ologun most notably fought Thai kickboxer Buakaw Por. Pramuk at K-1 World MAX 2007 World Elite Showcase, a fight Ologun lost via decision. Later same year Ologun fought 2 times and reigning K-1 champion Andy Souwer at SHOOT BOXING BATTLE SUMMIT GROUND ZERO TOKYO. Ologun managed to score a first round knockdown on Souwer and also damaged Souwer's nose and bleed the opponent. However Souwer caught up later and dominated Ologun in second & third round to secure a decision win. Andy was to have a rematch with Buakaw Por. Pramuk in 2010, but the fight was delayed due to scheduling conflicts.

Andy is also popular in Japan for his fashion modeling, having modeled in Japan for Comme des Garçons, Sean John, Puma, Dior and Michael Kors, as well as several appearances on Japanese television programs SASUKE and Ninja Warrior. He was also a film extra in the movies Babel, Catch a Fire and Inception. Ologun also made a cameo appearance in a Buju Banton music video. As of 2010 his current K-1 kickboxing record is 2-5.

Ologun turned to professional boxing in mid-2011. Fighting out of Hiranaka Boxing School Gym, he made his debut with a second-round technical knockout in a 163-pound bout at the Nippon Budokan in Tokyo.

Mixed martial arts record

|-
| Win
| align=center|3-1
| Katsuaki Furuki
| Decision (unanimous)
| Dynamite!! 2010
| 
| align=center|3
| align=center|5:00
| Saitama, Japan
| 
|-
| Win
| align=center|2-1
| Yukio Sakaguchi
| KO (punches) 
| Fields Dynamite!! 2008
| 
| align=center|1
| align=center|3:52
| Saitama, Japan
| 
|-
| Loss
| align=center|1-1
| Daisuke Nakamura 
| Submission (flying armbar) 
| Dream 5: Lightweight Grand Prix 2008 Final Round
| 
| align=center|1
| align=center|3:41
| Osaka, Japan
| 
|-
| Win
| align=center|1-0
| Ken Kaneko 
| Decision (unanimous)
| K-1 Premium Dynamite!! 2006
| 
| align=center|3
| align=center|5:00
| Osaka, Japan
|

Kickboxing record

References

External links

Living people
1983 births
Nigerian male mixed martial artists
Lightweight mixed martial artists
Welterweight mixed martial artists
Mixed martial artists utilizing boxing
Mixed martial artists utilizing kickboxing
Mixed martial artists utilizing wrestling
Mixed martial artists utilizing Brazilian jiu-jitsu
Nigerian male kickboxers
Welterweight kickboxers
Light-middleweight boxers
Male actors from Ibadan
Sportspeople from Saitama (city)
Naturalized citizens of Japan
Nigerian emigrants to Japan
Japanese people of Yoruba descent
Yoruba sportspeople
Yoruba male models
Nigerian male models
Sasuke (TV series) contestants
Yoruba male actors
21st-century Japanese male actors
Japanese male models
Nigerian male boxers
Nigerian practitioners of Brazilian jiu-jitsu